Centre USD 397 is a public unified school district headquartered in a rural area between Lost Springs and Lincolnville in Kansas.  The district includes the communities of Lincolnville, Lost Springs, Pilsen, Tampa, Ramona, Antelope, Burdick, and nearby rural areas of Marion / Morris / Dickinson / Chase Counties.

History
In 1945, the School Reorganization Act in Kansas caused the consolidation of thousands of rural school districts in Kansas.  In 1963, the School Unification Act in Kansas caused the further consolidatation of thousands of tiny school districts into hundreds of larger Unified School Districts. 

In 1956, a school district was formed with the consolidation of the Lincolnville, Burdick, Lost Springs, and Ramona school districts. The Tampa school district was added later.

In 1965, the school district was approved by the state to become Unified School District (USD) 397.

Current schools
The school district operates the following school:
 Centre School in rural area between Lost Springs and Lincolnville.  It is located east of 310th St and U.S. 77 highway.

Closed schools
 Centre Elementary School in Lost Springs at northeast corner of Crane and Berry.  It was closed.
 Burdick High School in Burdick at north corner of Reed and Edwards.  It was closed.
 Pilsen Elementary School in Pilsen at northwest corner of 275th Street and Robin Street.  It was closed, and now the Pilsen Community Center.
 Ramona High School in Ramona at 607 D Street.  It was closed, and now a business.
 Tampa High School in Tampa.  It was closed, then demolished.

See also
 Kansas State Department of Education
 Kansas State High School Activities Association
 List of high schools in Kansas
 List of unified school districts in Kansas

References

Further reading

External links
 

School districts in Kansas
Education in Marion County, Kansas
School districts established in 1956
1956 establishments in Kansas